Shoukath Sahajotsu (born 1971 in Paluvai in Thrissur district in Kerala, India) is a Malayalam philosophical mystical writer He received Kerala Sahitya Akademi award for 2007 for his writing Himalayam.

He is the author of Bhakti - Yatiyude Nirvachanam, Daivathinu Oru Thuranna Kathu, Nithyantharangam, Mozhiyazham, Athmavil Ninnum jeevithathilekku, Mounapoorvam, Thazhvarayude Sangeetham, Snehadaram, Sahajamaya Vazhi, Ramana Maharshi, Nooru Dhyanangal, Kabeer, Jeevitham Paranjath, Masnavi, and Rumi.

References

External links
 Biography at Mathrubhumi
 https://www.youtube.com/c/ShoukathSahajotsu/videos

1971 births
Malayalam-language writers
Living people
People from Thrissur district
Date of birth missing (living people)